The Essential Mondo Rock is a 2 disc compilation album by Australian rock band Mondo Rock, released in October 2003 by Sony Music Australia. It peaked at number 70 on the ARIA Charts in November 2003.

Background and release
Mondo Rock were formed in Melbourne in 1977 and were a staple of the Australian rock scene throughout the 1980s with 4 top 10 albums and a string of hit singles. Disc 1 features hits and singles, while disc 2 features non-album singles, instrumentals, live tracks and two songs never before heard on disc. The album was released to coincide with the Here & Now concert tour.

Track listing
 Disc 1
 "No Time" (Eric McCusker) – 4:01
 "Summer of '81" (McCusker) – 3:49
 "State of the Heart" (McCusker) – 4:18
 "Cool World" (Ross Wilson) – 3:34
 "Chemistry" (McCusker, Paul Christie) – 3:39
 "The Queen and Me" (McCusker) – 3:21
 "A Touch of Paradise" (Gulliver Smith, Wilson) – 4:13
 "Come Said the Boy" (McCusker) – 5:15
 "The Modern Bop"  (Wilson) – 3:46
 "Baby Wants to Rock" (James Black, Wilson) – 4:31
 "The Moment"  (McCusker) – 3:39
 "Rule of Threes" (McCusker) – 4:06
 "Boom Baby Boom" (McCusker, J. J. Hackett, Wilson) – 4:20
 "Primitive Love Rites" (Hackett, Wilson) – 4:51
 "Why Fight It" (McCusker, Wilson) – 5:27
 "I Had You in Mind" (McCusker) – 4:17
 "Soul Reason" (McCusker, Harry Bogdanovs) – 4:28

Disc 2
 "Il Mondo Caffe" (Black, Wilson) – 2:44
 "Mondo Sexo" (Wilson) – 3:02
 "Domination" (Black, Christie, Wilson) – 4:26
 "Winds Light to Variable" (McCusker, Hackett, Black, James Gillard, Wilson) – 3:51
 "Moves"  (McCusker) – 4:00
 "Mona Lisa"  (McCusker) – 3:52
 "Tied Up in Knots" (McCusker) – 4:51
 "Slice of Life"  (McCusker) – 4:00
 "We're No Angels"  (Wilson) – 6:27
 "The Fugitive Kind"  (Wilson, Tony Slavich) – 3:35
 "Aliens Walk Among Us" (Wilson) – 4:14
 "Dark Secrets" (McCusker) – 5:16

Charts
The Essential Mondo Rock debuted at number 94 on the ARIA Charts and peaked at number 70 on 17 November 2003.

Release history

References

2003 compilation albums
Mondo Rock albums
Compilation albums by Australian artists
Sony Music Australia compilation albums
Albums produced by John L Sayers